Jean-Claude Villain is a French writer. He was born in Mâcon (France) in 1947.

Biography 
Born in Burgundy in 1947, he lives on the Mediterranean sea side since 1975, and now shares his life between South France and Tunisia.
He taught philosophy for 35 years. He pursues a literary work for forty years, mainly turned to the Mediterranean world, through myths and tragic, that he expresses in poetry works, theater plays, shorts novels, essays, as well as travels, friendships and translations.

Works 
He is the author of twenty books of poetry (among his most famous titles : “Parole, exil”, The Tomb of Kings,Leur dit, Thalassa pour un retour), all accompanied by the contribution of contemporary painters, as well theatre plays, studies on contemporary poets, essays, chronicles, short stories, French versions of foreign poets, and numerous artists' books.
He pursued for a long time a literary critic activity for numerous French and foreign reviews, issued in different languages.
He takes part in festivals and colloquiums in various countries and gives public readings as well as recitals, sometimes accompanied by musicians.

His works are translated and published in several languages.

His most recent works are : Yeux ouverts dans le noir (Eyes open in the dark) (L’Harmattan Publ., Paris), Fragments du fleuve asséché (Pieces of the dried river) (Éditions L'Arbre à paroles, Belgium), Ithaques (Ithacas) (Éditions Le Cormier, Brussels)
Two essays were issued on his work: one from Chantal Danjou “Jean-Claude Villain, the checkerboard of words and silence “(L’Harmattan Publ., 2001), another from Constance Dima, “Forms of love in Jean-Claude Villain's work” (Kornilia Sfakianaki Publ., University of Thessaloniki, 2006). A file was dedicated to him by the magazine Encres vives on 2003 and a video by Itiné'art.

Bibliography
Poetry:
Ithaques, 2011, Le Cormier Publ., Vrille ce vertige, 2008, Propos 2 Publ.,. Fragments du fleuve asséché, 2007, L’Arbre à paroles Publ., Retour au sud, 2003, Tipaza Publ., Dix stèles et une brisées en un jardin, 1998, Tipaza Publ., Thalassa pour un retour, 1997, L'Harmattan Publ., Eté, froide saison, 1996, L'Harmattan Publ., Sept chants de relevailles, 1994, Encres Vives Publ., (2° éd. 2001), Orbes, 1993, L'Harmattan Publ., Et lui grand fauve aimant que l'été traverse, 1993, Unimuse Publ. (Belgium), Leur Dit, 1992, L'Harmattan Publ., Le Tombeau des Rois, followed by Roi, guerrier et mendiant, 1991, L'Harmattan Publ., Parole, exil, précédé de Confins, 1990, L'Harmattan Publ., Le schiste des songes, (Lieux II), 1989, Telo Martius Publ., Le Pays d'où je viens s'appelle amour, 1988, Des Aires Publ., Face à la mer, followed by Brève Béance, 1987, H.C. Du côté des terres, 1985, Le Temps parallèle Publ., Le soleil au plus près, 1984, H.C. Du gel sur les mains, 1979, H.C. Paroles pour un silence prochain, 1977, Plein Chant Publ., Terres étreintes, 1977, L'Arbre Publ., Au creux de l'oreille, 1974, St Germain des Prés Publ.
Prose : Le monde est beau et nous avons des yeux pour voir, 2005 (3° éd. en 2010), Encres vives Publ., Yeux ouverts dans le noir, récit poétique, 2003, L’Harmattan Publ., Aïssawiya, short novels, 2003, L'Harmattan Publ., L’Heure de Pan, short proses, 2002, L’Harmattan Publ., Le Marchand d'épices, contes poétiques, 2001, Encres Vives Publ., Labrys, theater, 2001, L'Harmattan Publ., Écrire au sud, chronicles, 2000, Encres Vives Publ., Pour Refuge B, theater, 2000, Les Cahiers de L'Egaré Publ., Essais de compréhension mythologique, 1999, L'Harmattan Publ.,Jean-Max Tixier à l'arête des mots, essay, 1995, L'Harmattan Publ., Matinales de pluie, letters, 1995, L'Harmattan Publ.
Works translated : Et lui grand fauve aimant que l'été traverse, in Greek by Nicholas Iordanidis, 2011, Lagoudera Publ., Athens. Essais de compréhension mythologique, in Greek by Constance Dima, 2005, Ed. Anémodeiktis, Athens. Et lui grand fauve aimant que l'été traverse, in Bulgarian by Aksinia Maikholova, 2003, Ed. Aquarium Méditerranéen, Sofia, Semelles de vent, title gathering Le Marchand d’épices and Sept chants de relevailles, in Arabic by Imane Riha, 2003, Anep Publ., Algiers.
Numerous artists' books with contemporary painters.
Sources, bibliographie[modifier | modifier le code]
Chantal Danjou : "Jean-Claude Villain, damier de parole et silence", essay followed by interviews, 2001, L'Harmattan Publ., Paris.
Notes et références[modifier | modifier le code]
1.      ↑ Notice d'autorité de la BNF [archive].
Lien externe[modifier | modifier le code]
Jean-Claude Villain on literary web sites : Poetas del Mundo, la Société des Gens de Lettres, Le Printemps des poètes, le cipM (International Center of Poetry Marseille), Poezibao, Terres de femmes, Les Carnets d'Eucharis, L'Harmattan Publ.

Further reading 
Chantal Danjou : "Jean-Claude Villain, damier de parole et silence", essay followed by interviews, 2001. L'Harmattan, Paris 
Constance Dima : "Forms of love in Jean-Claude Villain's work", essay, 2006 Kornilia Sfakianaki Publ., University of Thessaloniki Greece

References

External links
http://www.latribune-online.com/suplements/culturel/54502.html
http://www.lesauvage.org/2011/12/la-fin-des-villes-et-les-peuples-premiers/

1947 births
Living people
French male poets
French poets
People from Mâcon